Zhang Chong may refer to:

 Zhang Chong (politician) (1900 – 1980), Chinese politician
 Zhang Chong (footballer) (born 1987), Chinese footballer
 Zhang Chong (film director) (born 1987), Chinese film director